Lake Wānaka is New Zealand's fourth-largest lake and the seat of the town of Wānaka in the Otago region.

Geography

Geography
Lake Wānaka lies at the heart of the Otago Lakes in the lower South Island of New Zealand. The township of Wānaka, which sits in a glacier-carved basin on the shores of the lake, is the gateway to Mt Aspiring National Park. Lake Hāwea is a 15-minute drive away, en route to the frontier town of Makarora, the last stop before the West Coast Glacier region. To the south is the historic Cardrona Valley, a popular scenic alpine route to neighbouring Queenstown.

Geology
Lake Wānaka lies in a u-shaped valley formed by glacial erosion during the last ice age more than 10,000 years ago. It is fed by the Mātukituki and Makarora Rivers, and is the source of the Clutha River / Mata-Au.

At its greatest extent, which is roughly along a north–south axis, the lake is 42 kilometres long. Its widest point, at the southern end, is 10 kilometres. The lake's western shore is lined with high peaks rising to over 2000 metres above sea level. Along the eastern shore the land is also mountainous, but the peaks are somewhat lower.

Nearby Lake Hāwea lies in a parallel valley carved by a neighbouring glacier eight kilometres to the east. At their closest point (a rocky ridge called The Neck), the lakes are only 1000 metres apart.

Some host ecological sanctuaries, such as one for buff weka on Stevensons Island.  island is 120 hectares in size and is a pest free island. Mountain stone weta and the Southern Alps gecko can be found here.

The towns of Wānaka and Albert Town are near the lake's outflow into the Clutha River / Mata-Au.

Climate

Human history

Exploration and settlement

For Māori, the Wānaka area was a natural crossroads. Native reeds were used to build , small boats that enabled a swift return downriver to the east coast. The Cromwell basin supported a large population of moa, which were hunted to extinction about 500 years ago.

According to the Ngāi Tahu, Lake Wānaka was dug by the Waitaha explorer  with his  (foot plough) named .

The Kāti Māmoe settlement at the southern end of the lake was named . The area was invaded by the Ngāi Tahu in the early 18th century.

Ngāi Tahu use of the land was ended by attacks by North Island tribes. In the last years of the Musket Wars, in 1836 the Ngati Tama chief Te Puoho led a 100-person  (war party), armed with muskets, down the West Coast and over the Haast Pass. They fell on the Ngāi Tahu encampment between Lake Wānaka and Lake Hāwea, capturing 10 people and killing and eating two children. Although Te Puoho was later killed by the southern Ngāi Tahu leader Tuhawaiki, Māori seasonal visits to the area ceased.

The first recorded map of Lake Wānaka was drawn in 1844 by the southern Ngāi Tahu leader . The first Pākehā to see the lake was Nathaniel Chalmers in 1853.

By 1861, several sheep stations had been established in and around the south end of the lake, and in 1862, the lake itself was surveyed in a whaleboat.

Names
The name "Lake Wanaka" was in use in 1863 when the first survey of the proposed township of Wanaka was made. 

The town was renamed "Pembroke" within a month of the surveyor returning his books to Dunedin. It reverted to "Wanaka" on 1 September 1940, to reduce confusion between the names of the town and the lake.

The official name of the lake was updated from "Lake Wanaka" to "Lake Wānaka" in 2019, and the town's name to "Wānaka" in 2021.

Current use and tourism

The lake is now a popular resort, and is much used in the summer for fishing, boating and swimming. The nearby mountains and fast-flowing rivers support adventure tourism year-round. 

Popular activities include alpine and cross-country skiing and snowsports, tramping, mountain-biking, mountaineering, rock-climbing and parapenting.

Conservation
As one of the few lakes in the South Island with an unmodified shoreline, the lake is protected by special legislation, the Lake Wanaka Preservation Act of 1973. The Act established a 'Guardians of Lake Wanaka' group, appointed by the Minister of Conservation, which advises on measures to protect the lake.

Oxygen weed (Lagarosiphon major), an aquarium plant and invasive species native to Southern Africa, has been a problem in the lake's ecosystem for some time. Attempts to eradicate the weed have not been successful. Substantial suction dredging operations have shown promise, but tend to miss isolated spots which then regrow into larger weed beds.

In popular culture

A willow growing just inside the lake, often known as That Wanaka Tree, is a tourist attraction in its own right, featuring on many tourists' Instagram feeds.

In film

The region has been the setting for many international films, including The Lord of the Rings, The Hobbit, the Legend of S, and A Wrinkle in Time. Lake Wānaka was mentioned several times in the 2006 movie Mission: Impossible III as a location the lead couple visited and as the answer to Ethan Hunt's question on the phone to verify the identity of his wife.

The New Zealand cook and author Annabel Langbein, who owns a small estate at the side of the lake, filmed her series The Free Range Cook and Simple Pleasures here.

As a doomsday refuge
New Zealand, and Wānaka and Queenstown in particular, have been reported to be a favoured refuge for the 'super rich' in the event of a cataclysm. One such high net worth individual is Peter Thiel, who purchased  of lakeside land in 2015. While he had not yet developed it , plans have been announced to develop it as a luxury resort.

See also
 Lakes of New Zealand
 List of lakes in New Zealand
 Otago Geography
 Roys Peak
 Sentinel Peak (New Zealand)

Explanatory notes

References

External links 
 

Lakes of Otago
Wānaka
Clutha River